Constance Lewallen (1939–2022) was an American curator. She was curator at the Berkeley Art Museum and Pacific Film Archive. She was known for her support of Conceptual art and West Coast artists.

Life and career 
Lewallen was born in New York. She attended Fieldston School followed by an undergraduate degree from Mount Holyoke College. She received a master's from San Diego State University in 1970.

Lewallen's first worked at Bykert Gallery in New York, where she met Michael Snow and Vito Acconci. After moving to Los Angeles, Lewallen worked for Cirrus Editions and Broxton Gallery (with Larry Gagosian). Lewawllen then founded ThomasLewallen Gallery and Foundation for Art Research, a non-profit. Lewallen moved to the Bay Area in 1980. She worked for the Berkeley Art Museum from 1980 until 2007; first as Matrix curator (1980–88), then as Senior Curator (1998–2007). Lewallen also worked as associate director of Crown Point Press, a fine-art printer and publisher, in the 1980s and 90s. She was a contributing editor to the Brooklyn Rail.

Lewallen was married to poet Bill Berkson.

Curatorial work 
Lewallen was known for her work around the California Conceptual art movement of the 1970s. Her exhibitions helped to assert that Conceptual art had roots beyond New York City. "State of Mind New California Art circa 1970", curated with Karen Moss in 2011, was a seminal contribution to the history of West Coast conceptualism. In 1980, Lewallen wrote a chonology for the San Francisco Museum of Modern Art about the development of conceptual art in the 1970s.

In addition to her work on conceptualism, Lewallen was known for her solo shows of single artists, including Theresa Hak Kyung Cha, Bruce Nauman, Joe Brainerd, Jay DeFeo, and Paul Kos.

References 

Living people
American art curators
American women curators
Mount Holyoke College alumni
21st-century American women
University of California, San Diego alumni
Women art historians
1939 births